is the 21st single by Japanese entertainer Miho Nakayama. Written by Gorō Matsui and Kenjirō Sakiya, the single was released on February 12, 1991, by King Records.

Background and release
"Kore kara no I Love You" was rearranged from its original version in the album Jeweluna for its release as a single.

"Kore kara no I Love You" became Nakayama's fourth straight No. 3 on Oricon's weekly singles chart and sold over 145,000 copies.

Track listing

Charts

References

External links

1990 songs
1991 singles
Japanese-language songs
Miho Nakayama songs
Songs with lyrics by Gorō Matsui
King Records (Japan) singles